The Bolivarian Games (Spanish: Juegos Bolivarianos, full name Juegos Deportivos Bolivarianos) are a regional multi-sport event held in honor of Simón Bolívar, and organized by the Bolivarian Sports Organization (Organización Deportiva Bolivariana, ODEBO). The event is open to athletes from Bolivia, Colombia, Ecuador, Panama, Peru, and Venezuela. In 2010, the ODEBO decided to include Chile as the seventh member of ODEBO. Except Panama, all other participating countries are Andean states.

History

The first Games were held in 1938 in Bogotá, Colombia for the city's 400th anniversary. They have since been held irregularly, but every four years since 1973, with the most recent edition in Valledupar, Colombia in 2022. Inspired by the events of 1936 Summer Olympics in Berlin, Alberto Nariño Cheyne was the key designer of the idea of a Games to foster unity among the Bolivarian countries through the means of sport.

Following the first Games, the Bolivarian Sports Organization was formed as a sub-organisation of the Pan American Sports Organization by six founding members from the respective countries – Jorge Rodríguez Hurtado (Bolivia), Alberto Nariño Cheyne (Colombia), Galo Plaza Lasso (Ecuador), Luis Saavedra (Panama), Alfredo Hohagen Diez Canseco (Peru) and Julio Bustamante (Venezuela).

In terms of medals, Peru was dominant in the early years of the competition but Venezuela has consistently been the most successful country since the 1960s.

A detailed history of the early editions of the Bolivarian Games between 1938 and 1989 was published in a book written (in Spanish) by José Gamarra Zorrilla, former president of the Bolivian Olympic Committee, and first president (1976-1982) of ODESUR.

Summary

Games

Beach Games

Notes

Youth Games

Sports 
The following table was compiled based on information extracted from a variety of sources.  It should be considered as incomplete.

Disciplines from the same sport are grouped under the same color:

 Aquatics –
 Cycling –
 Football –
 Gymnastics –
 Underwater sports –
 Volleyball -
 Basketball

All-time medal count 
The total medal count for all the Games until 2022 is tabulated below. This table is sorted by the number of gold medals won by each country. The number of silver medals is taken into consideration next, and then the number of bronze medals. Chile, Dominican Republic, El Salvador, Guatemala and Paraguay started competing since the 2013 Bolivarian Games.

As of 2022:

All time records
 Colombia holds the record for the highest number of gold medals won for a country in a single edition, obtaining 213 gold medals at the 2017 Bolivarian Games in Santa Marta as the host nation.
 Colombia holds the record for the biggest lead of gold medals to second place, obtaining a margin of 119 gold medals over Venezuela in Santa Marta 2017.
 Colombia holds the record for the biggest lead of total medals to second place, 168 medals more than Venezuela in 2017.
 Venezuela holds the record for the highest number of total medals obtained in a single edition with 476 in the 2009 Bolivarian Games in Sucre.

All-time medal count (Beach Games)

As 2016

See also
Pan American Games
Parapan American Games
Central American and Caribbean Games
Central American Games
South American Games

References

External links 
 
 2001 Bolivarian Games results 
 2005 Bolivarian Games official website 
 2009 Bolivarian Games official website  

 
Multi-sport events in South America